Daniel Sereinig (born 10 May 1982) is a Swiss former professional footballer who played as defender.

Career
Sereinig was born in Wil, Switzerland. He joined SC Freiburg in January 2009 from SCR Altach. He was generally a member of the team's reserve squad, however, made his professional debut in the Bundesliga on 2 October 2010 as a late substitute against 1. FC Köln.

On 28 January 2011, he signed a contract with FC Winterthur until summer 2012 with the option to extend it by one season.

References

External links
 
 

1982 births
Living people
Swiss people of Austrian descent
Swiss men's footballers
Association football defenders
Swiss Super League players
Swiss Challenge League players
Bundesliga players
Regionalliga players
Austrian Football Bundesliga players
FC St. Gallen players
FC Wil players
FC Schaffhausen players
Rot-Weiss Essen players
SC Rheindorf Altach players
SC Freiburg players
SC Freiburg II players
FC Winterthur players
Swiss expatriate footballers
Swiss expatriate sportspeople in Germany
Expatriate footballers in Germany
Swiss expatriate sportspeople in Austria
Expatriate footballers in Austria